The 7th Adelaide Film Festival was held in Adelaide, South Australia, from 15 to 25 October 2015.

Description
Amanda Duthie was the Festival Director of the 7th edition of the festival, which ran from 15 to 25 October 2015.

On the opening night of the festival, director and screenwriter Andrew Bovell received the 2015 Don Dunstan Award for his contribution to the Australian film industry.

The festival opened with Scott Hicks's documentary film Highly Strung and closed with Paolo Sorrentino's drama film Youth.

More than 180 feature films were screened at the festival, 40 of which were Australian films, 24 South Australian films and total of 51 countries were represented at the Festival.

Competition

Jury
The members of the International Feature Jury were:
 Christian Jeune, French Director of the Film Department at Cannes
 Annemarie Jacir, Palestinian Director of Philistine Films
 Maggie Lee, American Chief Asia Film Critic, Variety 
 Sophie Hyde, Australian director and producer, of Closer Productions

In competition
The Foxtel Movies International Award for Best Feature Film at the Festival was won by Neon Bull.

The Flinders University Documentary Award was awarded to Canadian director Amber Fares for Speed Sisters.

Girl Asleep won the 2015 Adelaide Film Festival Best Feature People Choice's Award. Holding the Man documentary, Remembering the Man won the People's Choice Award for Best Documentary, while the most popular short was Meryl Tankard's Michelle's Story.

The following films were selected for the In Competition section:

International Feature Competition

Documentaries

Special screenings
Special Events

References

External links
 

Adelaide Film Festival
Adelaide Film Festival
2010s in Adelaide
Adelaide Film Festival